Metarctia robusta is a moth of the subfamily Arctiinae. It was described by Sergius G. Kiriakoff in 1973. It is found in Zambia.

References

 

Metarctia
Moths described in 1973
Endemic fauna of Zambia